, also known as Demon Slayer: Swordsmith Village is a 2023 Japanese animated dark fantasy action film based on the "Swordsmith Village" arc of the shōnen manga series Demon Slayer: Kimetsu no Yaiba by Koyoharu Gotouge. It is a direct sequel to the second season of the anime television series as well as its second film adaptation, following Demon Slayer: Kimetsu no Yaiba – The Movie: Mugen Train (2020). The film was directed by Haruo Sotozaki, written by Ufotable staff members, and produced by Ufotable in association with Aniplex and Shueisha.

The film premiered on February 3, 2023, in Japan, by Toho (in partnership with Aniplex); and was released throughout March 2023 internationally. It received praise for its storytelling, animation and fight sequences. The film has grossed  worldwide.

Plot 
As Tanjiro Kamado, his demonic younger sister Nezuko, and his friends Zenitsu Agatsuma and Inosuke Hashibira assist the Sound Hashira Tengen Uzui against demon siblings Gyutaro and Daki, both Upper Six of the Twelve Kizuki, they realize that the only way to kill the siblings is to behead them simultaneously. The group coordinate their attacks to decapitate Daki but Tengen is severely injured while Gyutaro stabs Inosuke from behind with poison to retrieve her sister's head. Zenitsu pushes Tanjiro off a roof to save him from Daki's obi sashes just as Gyutaro arrives to mock Tanjiro for his inability to save his friends.

Gyutaro persuades Tanjiro to turn into a demon but Tanjiro head-butts him, secretly stabbing the demon with a poisoned kunai. Gyutaro is immobilized and Tanjiro attempts to behead him. Before Daki can intervene, she is attacked by Zenitsu, who uses his breathing technique to reach her neck as Inosuke joins him, having survived by moving his internal organs upon being stabbed. Gyutaro removes the kunai and recovers; he almost kills Tanjiro but Tengen intervenes and battles Gyutaro. Tanjiro summons his remaining strength and slashes Gyutaro's neck while Zenitsu and Inosuke do the same with Daki.

After a final attack, the Demon Slayers behead the siblings, whose heads roll close to each other. Tengen tells a heavily-poisoned Tanjiro to run away just as Gyutaro's body explodes into waves of blood blades that destroy the entire town. However, Nezuko uses her Blood Demon Art to burn the blades and save his brother from the poison. She also burns away Gyutaro's poison from Inosuke and Tengen, saving their lives. Tanjiro finds a dying Gyutaro and Daki arguing about their defeat and insulting their relationship.

Tanjiro intervenes but Daki disintegrates first while Gyutaro remembers their humans lives before being transformed into demons as he disintegrates as well. In the afterlife, both Gyutaro and Daki reconcile and promise to never be apart again as they walk together to Hell. Serpent Hashira Obanai Iguro arrives and praises Tengen for killing the Upper Six of the Twelve Kizuki but Tengen informs him about his retirement from the Demon Slayers and Tanjiro's potential. Meanwhile, demon king Muzan Kibutsuji summons the remaining five Upper Rank demons – Kokushibo, Doma, Akaza, Hantengu, and Gyokko – to inform them about Gyutaro and Daki's deaths.

Two months later, Tanjiro is still recovering from his injuries as Zenitsu and Inosuke were summoned to individual missions a week ago. Because swordsmith Hotaru Haganezuka refuses to forge him a new sword due to his previous breakings, Tanjiro is told to meet him at the Swordsmith Village to discuss in person. He arrives with Nezuko and both meet with Love Hashira Mitsuri Kanroji as well as the village's chief Tecchin Tecchikawahara, who assures Tanjiro he will bring Hotaru back to build the sword.

While relaxing in hot springs, Tanjiro and Nezuko encounter Genya Shinazugawa, Wind Hashira Sanemi Shinazugawa's younger brother and a fellow Demon Slayer, who angrily strikes Tanjiro and storms off. Back at the village, Mitsuri hints Tanjiro about a "secret weapon" hidden in the village that can make him stronger and bids farewell to the siblings. The next day, while searching for Hotaru, Tanjiro meets with Mist Hashira Muichiro Tokito as he remembers a dream he had involving Yoriichi Tsugikuni, the first Demon Slayer.

Cast

Release

Theatrical 
The film was released theatrically in Japan on February 3, 2023. The film opened in 418 cinemas total, including all 38 IMAX cinemas within the country. The film had a very staggered international release, being released from as early as March 2, 2023, in Italy, Australia, South Korea, and New Zealand, to as late as March 10, 2023, in Mexico and Norway.

Television series version 
The first part of the third season of the anime television series, subtitled Swordsmith Village Arc, is an extended and recompiled version of the film that will start broadcasting on April 9, 2023, in Japan. The first episode will be a one-hour special.

Reception

Box office 
, Demon Slayer: Kimetsu no Yaiba – To the Swordsmith Village has grossed $10.1 million in the United States and Canada, and $38.6 million in other territories, for a worldwide total of $48.7 million.

In the United States and Canada, Demon Slayer: Kimetsu no Yaiba – To the Swordsmith Village was released alongside Creed III and Operation Fortune: Ruse de Guerre, was projected to gross $7.5–10 million from 1,774 theaters in its opening weekend. It ended up debuting to $10.1 million, finishing fourth at the box office.

Critical response 
On the review aggregator website Rotten Tomatoes, 80% of 5 critics' reviews are positive, with an average rating of 6.7/10. Audiences surveyed by CinemaScore gave the film an average grade of "B+" on an A+ to F scale, while those polled by PostTrak gave it a 74% positive score, with 61% saying they would definitely recommend it.

Notes

References

External links 
  
  
 
 
 
 
 
 

Demon Slayer: Kimetsu no Yaiba
2023 anime films
2023 films
2020s Japanese-language films
2020s fantasy action films
2020s monster movies
Japanese animated feature films
Animated films based on animated series
Anime action films
Anime films based on manga
Anime films composed by Yuki Kajiura
Aniplex
Dark fantasy anime and manga
Demons in film
Films about mass murder
Films about massacres
Mass murder in fiction
Anime and manga about revenge
Films set in the Taishō period
Funimation
IMAX films
Japanese animated fantasy films
Japanese dark fantasy films
Japanese fantasy action films
Toho animated films
Ufotable
Vampires in animated film
Japanese adult animated films